The Church of Saint Elijah (Crkva svetog Ilije), also known as Saint Andrew's Church, is а Serbian Orthodox church located on a small hill near the city of Podujevo, in Kosovo. The complex includes an Orthodox cemetery. It was built in 1929, and has been demolished several times, as of 2010, the church has been rebuilt and renovated five times.

History

1941 destruction
The Church was shelled and dome was destroyed in 1941, during World War II. Later, after the creation of Yugoslavia, the church was restored by the Serbian residents of Podujevo. Reconstruction was finally finished in 1971.

1999 attack
In 1999, the church was burnt down in what appeared to "be a well-planned action, conducted by criminal elements" after KFOR patrols changed shifts. The barb wire that guarded building was cut and the door was forced open.

2004 destruction
In 2003, UNMIK made a request of the Diocese of Raška and Prizren to evacuate movable church inventory, as an attack seemed inevitable. The church was destroyed on 18 March 2004, during 2004 Kosovo Unrest. According to Czech KFOR Captain, Jindrich Plescher, the church was attacked by a mob of 500 Albanians. Czech media confirmed that Czech soldiers had to leave the Church compound that was destroyed along with the cemetery. The Albanians set a large fire in the middle of the church which severely burned it. Plescher stated that the Albanian attackers had dug up coffins from the nearby Serbian cemetery, and scattered the bones of the dead. St. Andrew was shelled, a bell tower completely destroyed with explosives and the wall that surrounded the church was demolished. The Reconstruction Implementation Commission, an EU funded project managed by the European Commission Liaison Office implemented by the Council of Europe, in order to promote the Rehabilitation of Cultural Heritage in Kosovo, noted:

Bell
After the destruction of the church, Czech KFOR soldiers found and confiscated the stolen bell of the St. Elijah Church from an Albanian family. The bell was a gift from Yugoslav King Alexander I Karađorđević to the Podujevo Church in 1932, two years prior to his assassination in Marseilles. The Albanian representatives asked three times for the bell, saying that the bell belonged to the Podujevo municipality. But The Czech KFOR battalion refused, saying that the bell is the property of the Serbian Orthodox Church, and Lieutenant colonel Josef Kopecky with Czech and Slovak soldiers delivered the bell to the Gračanica Monastery. The chaplain of the battalion personally cleaned the bell.

2006 attack

On 12 May 2006, the church was attacked once again by Kosovo Albanians. After partial reconstruction, led by the Council of Europe fund, the main doors of the church were breached, and all of the windows on the church were broken again.

See also
Anti-Serb sentiment
Battle of Podujevo
Podujevo bus bombing
Podujevo massacre

Notes

References

External links

Video of the destruction and desecration of St. Elijah's Church

Religious organizations established in the 1920s
20th-century Serbian Orthodox church buildings
Serbian Orthodox church buildings in Kosovo
Former Serbian Orthodox churches
1929 establishments in Yugoslavia
Destroyed churches in Kosovo
Cultural heritage of Kosovo
Persecution of Serbs
Podujevo